Xenocyprioides parvulus is a species of cyprinid of the genus Xenocyprioides. It is considered harmless to humans.

References

Cyprinidae
Cyprinid fish of Asia
Fish described in 1982
Freshwater fish of China